Dayra d'Mar Yoḥannan Daylamáyá (Monastery of Saint John of Dailam), also known as Naqortaya and Muqurtaya (literally "chiseled monastery"), is a Syriac Orthodox monastery that lies 3 km north of Bakhdida in Northern Iraq.

History 
The foundation of Naqortaya monastery is traditionally attributed to Mar Yoḥannan Daylamáyá, who was active in the region in the 7th century and was responsible, according to an historical legend, of converting its people from the Church of the East to the Syriac Orthodox Church. However, The oldest attested mention of the monastery dates back to the late 9th century, and another source(A Syriac manuscript) states that it was consecrated in 1115. Bar Hebraeus records that in 1261 the monastery was raided by the Kurds, who burned it down and killed its monks, and was abandoned until it was rebuilt in 1563. When the majority of the inhabitants of Bakhdida started converting to The Syriac Catholic Church in the 18th century the monastery still remained under the control of the Syriac Orthodox Church: but was left deserted. The monastery was excavated and rebuilt in 1998, and has an ancient carved altar and a large courtyard with a fountain and a statue. The Monastery fate is uncertain, however, at it has been occupied since 2014 by ISIS, a Muslim terrorist group which often destroys and desecrates religious sites that are not Sunni Islam in nature.

John of Dailam feast 
The Naqurtaya monastery is visited by thousands of Syriac Orthodox pilgrims from the Nineveh Plains region during the feast of Yoḥannan Daylamáyá the last Friday of March.

References

External links 

Christianity in Nineveh Governorate
Syriac Orthodox monasteries in Iraq
Christian monasteries established in the 7th century
7th-century churches